Hungry Again is the thirty-fifth solo studio album by American singer-songwriter Dolly Parton. It was released on August 25, 1998, by Decca Records and Blue Eye Records. The album was produced by Parton and her cousin, Richie Owens. It is seen as a predecessor to Parton's critically acclaimed bluegrass trilogy, The Grass Is Blue, Little Sparrow, and Halos & Horns.

Background
When Rising Tide Records closed its Nashville branch in March 1998, Parton found herself without a label. It was announced in April 1998 that Parton had signed with Decca Records to release her new album, Hungry Again, due to be released in August.

Parton wrote the album over a three month period in 1997 at her lake cottage outside Nashville and at her Tennessee Mountain Home in Sevierville, which was immortalized in her 1973 hit song. Detailing the writing process for Billboard, Parton said, "I went back home and fasted, not so much in a religious way but as a means of humbling myself and getting into the spirit of things. I ended up with 37 of the best songs I'd written in years, if not the best ever." Parton said that the songs that made the album resulted in a "more acoustic-type album." She also said that if the album was successful she had enough songs leftover for two or three follow-up albums, which she jokingly said  might be titled Still Hungry, Hungry Some More, or I'm Full Now.

The album was produced by Parton with her cousin, Richie Owens, and recorded in his basement studio with his band Shinola. "Shine On" was recorded at the House of Prayer where Parton's grandfather, Jake Owens, had been pastor for many years.

Release and promotion
Parton appeared on The Rosie O'Donnell Show on April 2, 1998, where she performed "Paradise Road."

The album's first single, "Honky Tonk Songs", was shipped to country radio on July 7, with an adds date of July 27. The song's music video was put into Hot Shot rotation on CMT.

Shelia Shipley Biddy, Decca's senior vice-president, told Billboard in July that the label had a "massive national plan" set up to support the album. The plan included a heavy emphasis on national TV appearances and servicing the album to radio. They also considered releasing the album to retail locations in a lunch-box which would include an apple-shaped notepad, a carrot-shaped ink pen, and a Dolly Madison cupcake.

Parton made an appearance on The Tonight Show with Jay Leno on August 24 to promote the album, performing "Honky Tonk Songs".

The album was released on August 25, 1998.

On August 28, she made an appearance on Today where she performed "Honky Tonk Songs" and "9 to 5". Parton also stopped by Live with Regis and Kathie Lee on August 31 and performed "Honky Tonk Songs". On September 30, Parton appeared on Prime Time Country where she performed "Honky Tonk Songs", "When Jesus Comes Calling for Me", "I Am Ready", and "The Salt in My Tears".

"The Salt in My Tears" was released as the second single on November 9. Following the second single's release, Parton made a second appearance on Live with Regis and Kathie Lee on November 24 and performed "The Salt in My Tears".

Critical reception

The album received mostly positive reviews from critics. Billboard gave a positive review of the album, saying that "Parton returns to her close-to-the-heart, personal writing and singing with this basement album." They went on to say "it's arguably some of the best stuff she has done in years," while also taking note that "country radio resoundingly rejected the first single." They felt that this was because "listeners no longer welcome such overt drinking songs told by a woman aiming to get drunk and dance." The review ended by saying that "after all these years, Parton remains a potent and special voice in country music."

Jana Pendragon at AllMusic gave the album four and a half stars out of five, calling the album "a timely, heartwarming project that displays all of the many aspects and facets of Parton's talent. She is endearing and respected, and she can still roll right over most anyone who gets in her way with a single note."

Commercial performance
Hungry Again peaked at number 23 on the Billboard Top Country Albums chart and number 167 on the Billboard 200.

The album also peaked at number 3 on the UK Country Albums Chart and number 41 on the UK Albums Chart.

The first single, "Honky Tonk Songs", peaked at number 74 on the Billboard Hot Country Singles & Tracks chart and number 91 in Canada on the RPM Country Singles chart.

Track listing

Personnel
Adapted from the album liner notes.

 Lois Baker - background vocals 
 Jim Boling - background vocals 
 Paul Brewster - background vocals 
 Mark A. Brooks - bass guitar, upright bass
  Gary Davis - banjo, acoustic guitar
 Rachel Dennison - background vocals 
 Richard Dennison - background vocals 
 Joy Gardner – background vocals 
 Bob "Bubba" Grundner – drums, percussion
 Honky Tonk Women – background vocals 
 House of Prayer Congregation – background vocals 
 Teresa Hughes – background vocals 
 Johnny Lauffer – organ, piano, strings
 Randy Leago – accordion
 Gary Mackey – fiddle, mandolin
 Louis Dean Nunley – background vocals 
 Jennifer O'Brien – background vocals 
 Bob Ocker – acoustic guitar, electric guitar
 Judy Ogle – background vocals 
 Richie Owens – autoharp, bouzouki, dobro, acoustic guitar, electric guitar, harmonica, Kona guitar, mandolin, slide guitar, background vocals 
 Ira Parker – background vocals 
 Dolly Parton – lead vocals 
 Al Perkins – pedal steel guitar
 Eric Rupert – bass guitar 
 Darrin Vincent – background vocals 
 Rhonda Vincent – background vocals 
 Brian Waldschlager – background vocals

Charts
Album

Singles

References

1998 albums
Decca Records albums
Dolly Parton albums